Isabella Dal Balcon (born 11 September 1977) is an Italian professional snowboarder based in Torino. Dal Balcon has to date competed in two Winter Olympic Games in 2002 and 2006 but has failed to achieve a medal in either games. She has also competed in several world cups with more success achieving two podium positions including two first placings in 2006 and 2007.

Footnotes

External links

1977 births
Living people
Italian female snowboarders
Olympic snowboarders of Italy
Snowboarders at the 2002 Winter Olympics
Snowboarders at the 2006 Winter Olympics
21st-century Italian women